Draveil is a commune in the department of Essonne in the southern suburbs of Paris, France. It was formally twinned with Hove, East Sussex in The United Kingdom.

With a score of 7.16/10, Draveil ranks 49th among the 100 best French towns with a population of over 20,000 inhabitants. This result is a survey conducted permanently among the French population and takes into account the following factors : environment, security, medical facilities, cultural events, sports, shops and transport.

Geography

Draveil is situated between the right bank of the Seine and the Forest of Sénart which gives the whole town a very green environment. In fact, the official motto of the town in Latin is "Inter undas et arbores", which can be translated into English as "between water and trees", a reference to its location between the Seine and the Forest of Sénart. Hardly a third of Draveil's area has been developed, thus offering a preserved environment to its inhabitants. Draveil also hosts a large green park called the "Base de loisirs du Port-aux-Cerises" that covers over 175 hectares including trees, lakes and activity areas including a horse-riding club, an amusement park for children, an open-air swimming-pool, football field, tennis courts, acrobranche rope park, a small marina with berthing space for about thirty boats, etc.

Draveil consists of the main town Draveil, the former villages Champrosay and Mainville, and several newer housing developments. Champrosay was home to several artists in the 19th and early 20th century, including painters Marie Laurencin and Eugène Delacroix and writer Alphonse Daudet.

History

Human presence in Draveil during the Neolithic period is suggested by the discovery of a menhir called the "Pierre à Mousseaux" dating from the fourth millennium BC and confirmed by the presence of tools and weapons in flint cut found in the Mainville quarter of Draveil. The Gauls named the place Dracvern meaning "the spirit of the Alder". The Romans called it Dravernum. In the Merovingian period a money minting facility was installed here, which minted one-third of a gold sol called "Draverno".

Population

Inhabitants of Draveil are known as Draveillois.

Administration

Draveil is part of the arrondissement of Évry, the canton of Draveil and the communauté d'agglomération Val d'Yerres Val de Seine. The mayor of Draveil from 1995 until 2021 was Georges Tron. He resigned on 25 May 2021 following his sentence and imprisonment for sexual assault and rape. He was succeeded by Richard Privat in June 2021.

Schools

The town has eight preschools

 Ecole école Champrosay
 Ecole maternelle Antoine de Saint-Exupéry
 Ecole maternelle Hameau de Mainville
 Ecole maternelle Jean Jaurès 
 Ecole maternelle Jules Ferry
 Ecole maternelle Le belvédère
 Ecole maternelle Le Parc de Villiers
 Ecole maternelle Pierre Brossolette

It also has ten primary schools

 Ecole école Champrosay
 Ecole élémentaire Antoine de Saint-Exupéry
 Ecole élémentaire Hameau de Mainville
 Ecole élémentaire Jean Jaurès
 Ecole élémentaire Jules Ferry 
 Ecole élémentaire L Orme des Mazières
 Ecole élémentaire Le belvédère
 Ecole élémentaire Le Parc de Villiers
 Ecole primaire privée Notre-Dame (private)

There are three middle schools: 
 Alphonse Daudet
 Eugène Delacroix and 
 Notre Dame (private).

Draveil has one professional high school named "Lycée Nadar".

High schools around Draveil are either public like Lycée Rosa Parks in Montgéron.

There are three respected private institutions around Draveil:
 Institut de Saint Pierre in Brunoy 
 Lycée Notre Dame de Sion in Évry and
 Lycée Saint Louis Saint Clément in Viry-Châtillon. 
These private schools have a merit-based entrance scheme, have European curriculum, teach languages such as Chinese, etc.

Facilities for children

The infant department at the Mairie supervises a wide-range of day-care centres namely a family crèche, collective crèches like L’Île-aux-Bambins and Pomme-de-Rainette, parent-run day-care centres like crèche  Tétine et Doudou and two other day-care centres "Mazières" and "Villiers" that offer à la carte hours.

During school vacations, children are offered activities in "centres de loisirs" organised in the school premises in Villiers, Mazières, Jean-Jaurès, Brossolette, Belvédère, Champrosay, Jules-Ferry, Mainville, Saint-Exupéry and Pierre et Marie-Curie. Besides, the Mairie also organises a sports-oriented programme for kids between 8 and 14 called "Totalement sport".

Sports
A wide range of sports facilities are available at the "Base de loisirs du Port-aux-Cerises" namely, canoëing, kayaking, sailing, football field, tennis courts, minigolf, skatepark and horse-riding.

A rowing club and a yachting club are based on the banks of the Seine. Two other swimming pools (Caneton and Mainville) that offer different activities like aquagym are also available.

In the Bergeries quarter of the town, the COSEC Ferdinand-Buisson offers facilities for handball, table-tennis, badminton, gymnastics and martial arts. Other sports complex around the town organise activities such as volleyball, tennis, athletics, basketball, boxing, roller-blading, etc.

Health
A survey in 2010 found that there were thirty-eight doctors (general practitioners and specialists), fourteen dental surgeons, eleven pharmacists, etc.

Public transport

Many buses ply between many areas in Draveil round-the-clock on a regular basis. Fares for the buses are included in the Navigo pass. Buses from Draveil also serve Juvisy, Orly Airport, Rungis International Market and other neighbouring towns.
Draveil is not directly linked to the Paris Métro network. This is a result of a decision taken by the local authorities in order to keep land developers at bay and preserve the town's provincial charm. 
The Paris metro network can be reached from Juvisy station, which is across the Seine.  Juvisy station has two RER lines to reach the centre of Paris within 15 minutes: RER line C and RER line D. This station is located in the neighboring commune of Juvisy-sur-Orge,  from the town center of Draveil.

Famous inhabitants
A list of famous people who were either born or lived in Draveil include :
 Eugène Delacroix, painter  
 Ivan Turgenev, writer 
 Nadar, photographer
 Edmond de Goncourt, writer 
 Charles Euphrasie Kuwasseg, painter
 Alphonse Daudet, writer
 Marie Laurencin painter 
 Jean-Jacques Annaud, cinematographer
Paul Lafargue, Marxist political writer/activist
 Joffrey Torvic, footballer
 Frédéric Vasseur, motorsport engineer/manager

Gallery

See also
Communes of the Essonne department
Draveil-Villeneuve-Saint-Georges strike

References

External links

 Draveil town council website (in French)
 Tourism office webpage  (in French)
 Draveil children amusement park website (in French)
 Mayors of Essonne Association 

Communes of Essonne